The Ōhikaiti River is a river of the West Coast Region of New Zealand's South Island. It flows north from Mount Galileo, in the Paparoa Range, paralleling the course of the larger Ōhikanui River which lies two kilometres to the west. The Ōhikaiti empties into the Buller River at the Buller Gorge, 15 kilometres southwest of Westport.

The New Zealand Ministry for Culture and Heritage gives a translation of "place of small incantations" for Ōhikaiti.

Ōhikaiti River has been the official name of the river since it was gazetted on 21 June 2019. The explanation is given that 'o' means place of, 'hika' is a ritual and 'iti' and 'nui' are small and large. The ritual was for a chief, Te Pūoho-o-te-rangi, who died during a raid.

The river generally follows the Ōhikaiti Fault, which probably formed about 35 million years ago.

A totara bridge over the Little Ohika was built in 1877, but damaged by a flood on 4 November 1877. SH6 now crosses the river near its mouth.

See also
List of rivers of New Zealand

References

Rivers of the West Coast, New Zealand
Buller District
Rivers of New Zealand